Varberg is a village in Gävleborg, Sweden.

References

Populated places in Gävleborg County